Milos Zvonar (born 1937) is an anesthetist and former politician for the Pim Fortuyn List (LPF).

Zvonar was born in Prague and moved to the Netherlands following the invasion of Czechoslovakia in 1968. He had studied medicine at the University of Prague and later obtained a university certificate as a doctor at the University of Leiden. Zvonar was elected to the Member of the House of Representatives in 2002 as a member of the LPF. In parliament he caused a mild stir when he and fellow LPF MP  Gerlof Jukema stated they would force-feed Pim Fortuyn's killer Volkert van der Graaf when der Graaf announced his intention to go on a hunger strike. Zvonar stepped down from politics in 2003 and moved back to the Czech Republic. In the book The Children of Pim by Joost Vullings, Zvonar stated the political situation was better in the Czech Republic as there were no Turkish or Moroccan immigrants, and that the Netherlands now resembled a third world country due to high levels of immigration. He added It is not racism at all, we want our country for ourselves. People like this don't suit us at all.

References 

Living people
Pim Fortuyn List politicians
21st-century Dutch politicians
Dutch anesthesiologists
Czech anesthesiologists
1937 births
Members of the House of Representatives (Netherlands)
Leiden University alumni
Dutch people of Czech descent
Czech emigrants to the Netherlands